Sibel Alaş (born 13 February 1975) is a Turkish pop music singer and translator.

She graduated from American Culture and Literature Department in Istanbul University. Her first hit was 'Adam' (Man) from her album of the same name in 1995. She was both the vocalist and dancer of Yonca Evcimik before starting her solo career. She released second album, Fem (Not opened rose in Turkish or short of female in English) in 1996. She had a break in her music career after releasing the album Çocuk ("Child" in Turkish) in 1998 due to marrying her manager Zeki Aköz in 1996, and because of her disease, aneurysm. In 1998, she adopted a two-year-old daughter named Tuğçe.

In 2005, after being diagnosed with arteriovenous malformation, Alaş underwent a brain surgery. She released her fourth album, Carpe Diem ("Seize the day" in Latin) in 2006. After translating Hotel on the Corner of Bitter and Sweet to Turkish in 2008, she translated A Game of Thrones by George R. R. Martin.

Discography 
Albums
 Adam (1995)
 Fem (1996)
 Çocuk (1998)
 Carpe Diem (2006)

Singles
"Herkes Gibisin" (2014)

References

External links 
 Listen to samples + digital download

1975 births
Living people
Singers from Istanbul
Turkish pop singers
21st-century Turkish women singers